Hassan Koeman Sesay (born 5 September 1981 in Freetown, Sierra Leone) is a Sierra Leonean international footballer who plays for Hà Nội ACB, one of the biggest clubs in the Vietnamese top football league. Sesay also plays for the Sierra Leone national football team, for whom he has appeared in a 2010 FIFA World Cup qualifying match. He started his football career with local club Real Republicans in the Sierra Leone National First Division, the highest football league in Sierra Leone. He spent some seasons at the club then move to Goderich United then FC Kallon then Omani Al-Nasr based in Salalah before he moved to Vietnam.

References

External links

1981 births
Living people
Sierra Leonean footballers
Sierra Leone international footballers
Expatriate footballers in Vietnam

Association football central defenders